The discography of Jermaine Jackson includes 14 studio albums, 8 compilation albums, and 32 singles.

Albums

Studio albums

Compilations

Singles

Promotional singles

Notes
 a Released internationally as Dynamite.

References

External links

Discographies of American artists
Discography